The Braille pattern dots-1246 is a 6-dot braille cell with both top, the middle left, and bottom right dots raised, or an 8-dot braille cell with both top, the upper-middle left, and lower-middle right dots raised. It is represented by the Unicode code point U+282b, and in Braille ASCII with the dollar sign: $.

Unified Braille

In unified international braille, the braille pattern dots-1246 is used to represent a voiced dental or alveolar plosive, such as /d/ or /d̪/ when multiple letters correspond to these values, and is otherwise assigned as needed.

Table of unified braille values

Other braille

Plus dots 7 and 8

Related to Braille pattern dots-1246 are Braille patterns 12467, 12468, and 124678, which are used in 8-dot braille systems, such as Gardner-Salinas and Luxembourgish Braille.

Related 8-dot kantenji patterns

In the Japanese kantenji braille, the standard 8-dot Braille patterns 2358, 12358, 23458, and 123458 are the patterns related to Braille pattern dots-1246, since the two additional dots of kantenji patterns 01246, 12467, and 012467 are placed above the base 6-dot cell, instead of below, as in standard 8-dot braille.

Kantenji using braille patterns 2358, 12358, 23458, or 123458

This listing includes kantenji using Braille pattern dots-1246 for all 6349 kanji found in JIS C 6226-1978.

  - 犬

Variants and thematic compounds

  -  selector 1 + け/犬  =  天
  -  selector 2 + け/犬  =  太
  -  selector 3 + け/犬  =  夫
  -  selector 4 + け/犬  =  夭
  -  selector 5 + け/犬  =  咢
  -  selector 6 + け/犬  =  失
  -  selector 6 + selector 6 + け/犬  =  夸
  -  け/犬 + selector 4  =  鼬
  -  け/犬 + selector 5  =  鼡
  -  け/犬 + selector 6  =  猫
  -  比 + け/犬  =  大
  -  そ/馬 + け/犬  =  美

Compounds of 犬

  -  な/亻 + け/犬  =  伏
  -  心 + な/亻 + け/犬  =  茯
  -  ね/示 + な/亻 + け/犬  =  袱
  -  け/犬 + 火  =  然
  -  火 + け/犬  =  燃
  -  て/扌 + け/犬 + 火  =  撚
  -  へ/⺩ + け/犬  =  状
  -  み/耳 + け/犬  =  献
  -  み/耳 + み/耳 + け/犬  =  獻
  -  う/宀/#3 + け/犬  =  突
  -  め/目 + け/犬  =  臭
  -  も/門 + め/目 + け/犬  =  闃
  -  し/巿 + け/犬  =  黙
  -  し/巿 + し/巿 + け/犬  =  默
  -  け/犬 + れ/口  =  器
  -  け/犬 + け/犬 + れ/口  =  噐
  -  け/犬 + 龸  =  獣
  -  け/犬 + け/犬 + 龸  =  獸
  -  な/亻 + 龸 + け/犬  =  倏
  -  け/犬 + 宿 + れ/口  =  吠
  -  れ/口 + 宿 + け/犬  =  哭
  -  れ/口 + と/戸 + け/犬  =  唳
  -  て/扌 + と/戸 + け/犬  =  捩
  -  せ/食 + 宿 + け/犬  =  猷
  -  い/糹/#2 + と/戸 + け/犬  =  綟
  -  む/車 + 宿 + け/犬  =  飆

Compounds of 天

  -  な/亻 + selector 1 + け/犬  =  俣
  -  日 + selector 1 + け/犬  =  昊

Compounds of 太

  -  け/犬 + そ/馬  =  駄

Compounds of 夫

  -  て/扌 + け/犬  =  扶
  -  日 + け/犬  =  替
  -  氷/氵 + け/犬  =  潜
  -  氷/氵 + 氷/氵 + け/犬  =  潛
  -  selector 1 + 氷/氵 + け/犬  =  濳
  -  な/亻 + 日 + け/犬  =  僣
  -  仁/亻 + 日 + け/犬  =  僭
  -  え/訁 + 日 + け/犬  =  譛
  -  を/貝 + け/犬  =  賛
  -  を/貝 + を/貝 + け/犬  =  贊
  -  て/扌 + を/貝 + け/犬  =  攅
  -  い/糹/#2 + を/貝 + け/犬  =  纉
  -  え/訁 + を/貝 + け/犬  =  讃
  -  か/金 + を/貝 + け/犬  =  鑚
  -  け/犬 + 宿  =  規
  -  心 + け/犬 + 宿  =  槻
  -  け/犬 + ぬ/力  =  券
  -  け/犬 + け/犬 + ぬ/力  =  劵
  -  き/木 + け/犬 + ぬ/力  =  椦
  -  け/犬 + さ/阝  =  巻
  -  け/犬 + け/犬 + さ/阝  =  卷
  -  な/亻 + け/犬 + さ/阝  =  倦
  -  る/忄 + け/犬 + さ/阝  =  惓
  -  て/扌 + け/犬 + さ/阝  =  捲
  -  い/糹/#2 + け/犬 + さ/阝  =  綣
  -  む/車 + け/犬 + さ/阝  =  蜷
  -  け/犬 + て/扌  =  拳
  -  け/犬 + ほ/方  =  奉
  -  な/亻 + け/犬 + ほ/方  =  俸
  -  て/扌 + け/犬 + ほ/方  =  捧
  -  け/犬 + け/犬  =  奏
  -  に/氵 + け/犬 + け/犬  =  湊
  -  む/車 + け/犬 + け/犬  =  輳
  -  け/犬 + 日  =  春
  -  る/忄 + け/犬 + 日  =  惷
  -  心 + け/犬 + 日  =  椿
  -  せ/食 + け/犬 + 日  =  鰆
  -  け/犬 + に/氵  =  泰
  -  ら/月 + け/犬 + に/氵  =  滕
  -  け/犬 + の/禾  =  秦
  -  心 + け/犬 + の/禾  =  榛
  -  ゆ/彳 + け/犬 + の/禾  =  臻
  -  く/艹 + け/犬 + の/禾  =  蓁
  -  た/⽥ + selector 3 + け/犬  =  畉
  -  心 + selector 3 + け/犬  =  芙
  -  み/耳 + selector 3 + け/犬  =  趺
  -  む/車 + selector 3 + け/犬  =  輦
  -  す/発 + selector 3 + け/犬  =  麸
  -  ら/月 + け/犬 + ゐ/幺  =  縢
  -  め/目 + 宿 + け/犬  =  眷
  -  け/犬 + selector 6 + ぬ/力  =  舂
  -  け/犬 + 宿 + そ/馬  =  豢
  -  す/発 + 宿 + け/犬  =  麩

Compounds of 夭

  -  け/犬 + る/忄  =  忝
  -  れ/口 + け/犬  =  咲
  -  ら/月 + け/犬  =  朕
  -  ち/竹 + け/犬  =  笑
  -  ひ/辶 + け/犬  =  送
  -  か/金 + ひ/辶 + け/犬  =  鎹
  -  も/門 + け/犬  =  関
  -  も/門 + も/門 + け/犬  =  關
  -  け/犬 + 囗  =  呑
  -  り/分 + け/犬  =  兼
  -  よ/广 + け/犬  =  廉
  -  に/氵 + よ/广 + け/犬  =  濂
  -  ち/竹 + よ/广 + け/犬  =  簾
  -  ゑ/訁 + け/犬  =  謙
  -  け/犬 + ふ/女  =  嫌
  -  る/忄 + り/分 + け/犬  =  慊
  -  ん/止 + り/分 + け/犬  =  歉
  -  心 + り/分 + け/犬  =  蒹
  -  を/貝 + り/分 + け/犬  =  賺
  -  ふ/女 + 宿 + け/犬  =  妖
  -  ほ/方 + 宿 + け/犬  =  殀
  -  に/氵 + 宿 + け/犬  =  沃
  -  せ/食 + 龸 + け/犬  =  飫

Compounds of 咢

  -  せ/食 + け/犬  =  鰐
  -  る/忄 + 宿 + け/犬  =  愕
  -  け/犬 + ん/止 + の/禾  =  齶
  -  く/艹 + 宿 + け/犬  =  萼
  -  く/艹 + 龸 + け/犬  =  蕚
  -  え/訁 + 宿 + け/犬  =  諤
  -  さ/阝 + 宿 + け/犬  =  鄂
  -  か/金 + 宿 + け/犬  =  鍔
  -  け/犬 + 龸 + せ/食  =  鶚

Compounds of 失 and 夸

  -  の/禾 + け/犬  =  秩
  -  え/訁 + け/犬  =  誇
  -  は/辶 + け/犬  =  迭
  -  か/金 + け/犬  =  鉄
  -  か/金 + か/金 + け/犬  =  鐵
  -  な/亻 + selector 6 + け/犬  =  佚
  -  し/巿 + selector 6 + け/犬  =  帙
  -  み/耳 + selector 6 + け/犬  =  跌
  -  む/車 + selector 6 + け/犬  =  軼

Compounds of 鼬 and 鼡

  -  け/犬 + ろ/十  =  猟
  -  け/犬 + け/犬 + ろ/十  =  獵
  -  け/犬 + け/犬 + selector 5  =  鼠
  -  う/宀/#3 + け/犬 + selector 5  =  竄
  -  と/戸 + け/犬 + selector 5  =  鬣

Compounds of 猫 and ⺨

  -  た/⽥ + け/犬  =  猥
  -  け/犬 + は/辶  =  犯
  -  け/犬 + へ/⺩  =  狂
  -  え/訁 + け/犬 + へ/⺩  =  誑
  -  け/犬 + こ/子  =  狐
  -  け/犬 + も/門  =  狗
  -  け/犬 + う/宀/#3  =  狙
  -  け/犬 + す/発  =  狢
  -  け/犬 + し/巿  =  狩
  -  け/犬 + む/車  =  独
  -  け/犬 + け/犬 + む/車  =  獨
  -  け/犬 + な/亻  =  狭
  -  け/犬 + け/犬 + な/亻  =  狹
  -  け/犬 + や/疒  =  狼
  -  け/犬 + ⺼  =  猛
  -  け/犬 + り/分  =  猪
  -  に/氵 + け/犬 + り/分  =  潴
  -  け/犬 + せ/食  =  猶
  -  心 + け/犬 + せ/食  =  蕕
  -  け/犬 + え/訁  =  猿
  -  け/犬 + ゑ/訁  =  獄
  -  け/犬 + ら/月  =  獅
  -  け/犬 + く/艹  =  獲
  -  け/犬 + selector 6 + そ/馬  =  狃
  -  け/犬 + ろ/十 + selector 4  =  犲
  -  け/犬 + 宿 + 仁/亻  =  犹
  -  け/犬 + 宿 + 火  =  狄
  -  け/犬 + 比 + 宿  =  狆
  -  け/犬 + 数 + こ/子  =  狎
  -  け/犬 + 宿 + め/目  =  狒
  -  け/犬 + 日 + selector 1  =  狛
  -  け/犬 + selector 3 + や/疒  =  狠
  -  け/犬 + 龸 + ち/竹  =  狡
  -  け/犬 + 宿 + ら/月  =  狷
  -  け/犬 + 比 + り/分  =  狸
  -  け/犬 + 宿 + を/貝  =  狽
  -  け/犬 + 宿 + 宿  =  猊
  -  け/犬 + り/分 + 日  =  猖
  -  け/犬 + し/巿 + せ/食  =  猜
  -  け/犬 + お/頁 + ろ/十  =  猝
  -  け/犬 + 日 + い/糹/#2  =  猩
  -  け/犬 + 宿 + の/禾  =  猯
  -  け/犬 + 仁/亻 + や/疒  =  猴
  -  け/犬 + か/金 + ら/月  =  猾
  -  け/犬 + 宿 + く/艹  =  獏
  -  け/犬 + ん/止 + selector 1  =  獗
  -  け/犬 + り/分 + え/訁  =  獪
  -  け/犬 + 宿 + て/扌  =  獰
  -  け/犬 + お/頁 + 数  =  獺

Compounds of 大

  -  囗 + け/犬  =  因
  -  ふ/女 + け/犬  =  姻
  -  け/犬 + 心  =  恩
  -  れ/口 + 囗 + け/犬  =  咽
  -  も/門 + 囗 + け/犬  =  氤
  -  火 + 囗 + け/犬  =  烟
  -  く/艹 + 囗 + け/犬  =  茵
  -  け/犬 + か/金  =  奇
  -  つ/土 + け/犬  =  埼
  -  や/疒 + け/犬  =  崎
  -  心 + け/犬  =  椅
  -  ぬ/力 + け/犬  =  契
  -  き/木 + ぬ/力 + け/犬  =  楔
  -  ね/示 + ぬ/力 + け/犬  =  禊
  -  な/亻 + け/犬 + か/金  =  倚
  -  ぬ/力 + け/犬 + か/金  =  剞
  -  て/扌 + け/犬 + か/金  =  掎
  -  ん/止 + け/犬 + か/金  =  欹
  -  け/犬 + け/犬 + か/金  =  猗
  -  た/⽥ + け/犬 + か/金  =  畸
  -  selector 1 + け/犬 + か/金  =  竒
  -  い/糹/#2 + け/犬 + か/金  =  綺
  -  す/発 + け/犬 + か/金  =  羇
  -  け/犬 + け/犬 + か/金  =  猗
  -  と/戸 + け/犬  =  戻
  -  に/氵 + け/犬  =  涙
  -  け/犬 + お/頁  =  央
  -  ほ/方 + け/犬 + お/頁  =  殃
  -  に/氵 + け/犬 + お/頁  =  泱
  -  の/禾 + け/犬 + お/頁  =  秧
  -  と/戸 + け/犬 + お/頁  =  鞅
  -  け/犬 + 仁/亻  =  奈
  -  て/扌 + け/犬 + 仁/亻  =  捺
  -  け/犬 + と/戸  =  奔
  -  く/艹 + け/犬 + と/戸  =  莽
  -  む/車 + け/犬 + と/戸  =  蠎
  -  け/犬 + い/糹/#2  =  奪
  -  け/犬 + た/⽥  =  奮
  -  き/木 + け/犬  =  権
  -  き/木 + き/木 + け/犬  =  權
  -  け/犬 + ね/示  =  勧
  -  け/犬 + け/犬 + ね/示  =  勸
  -  け/犬 + ん/止  =  歓
  -  け/犬 + け/犬 + ん/止  =  歡
  -  け/犬 + め/目  =  観
  -  心 + け/犬 + め/目  =  欟
  -  け/犬 + け/犬 + め/目  =  觀
  -  え/訁 + 比 + け/犬  =  奕
  -  せ/食 + 比 + け/犬  =  奠
  -  そ/馬 + 比 + け/犬  =  尖
  -  ぬ/力 + 宿 + け/犬  =  刳
  -  け/犬 + も/門 + selector 2  =  匏
  -  け/犬 + 宿 + ろ/十  =  夲
  -  け/犬 + 宿 + つ/土  =  奎
  -  け/犬 + 宿 + と/戸  =  套
  -  け/犬 + へ/⺩ + つ/土  =  奘
  -  け/犬 + と/戸 + 日  =  奢
  -  け/犬 + も/門 + selector 3  =  奩
  -  や/疒 + う/宀/#3 + け/犬  =  嵜
  -  る/忄 + 龸 + け/犬  =  懽
  -  き/木 + 龸 + け/犬  =  桍
  -  け/犬 + き/木 + き/木  =  樊
  -  氷/氵 + 宿 + け/犬  =  潅
  -  氷/氵 + 龸 + け/犬  =  灌
  -  け/犬 + 心 + つ/土  =  瓠
  -  け/犬 + 宿 + た/⽥  =  畚
  -  ま/石 + 宿 + け/犬  =  碕
  -  ⺼ + 宿 + け/犬  =  胯
  -  ね/示 + 宿 + け/犬  =  袴
  -  え/訁 + 龸 + け/犬  =  讙
  -  み/耳 + 宿 + け/犬  =  跨
  -  か/金 + 龸 + け/犬  =  鑵
  -  お/頁 + 宿 + け/犬  =  顴
  -  そ/馬 + 宿 + け/犬  =  驩
  -  け/犬 + 宿 + せ/食  =  鸛

Other compounds

  -  仁/亻 + け/犬  =  傑
  -  ゆ/彳 + け/犬  =  径
  -  ゆ/彳 + ゆ/彳 + け/犬  =  徑
  -  る/忄 + け/犬  =  怪
  -  い/糹/#2 + け/犬  =  経
  -  い/糹/#2 + い/糹/#2 + け/犬  =  經
  -  く/艹 + け/犬  =  茎
  -  く/艹 + く/艹 + け/犬  =  莖
  -  む/車 + け/犬  =  軽
  -  む/車 + む/車 + け/犬  =  輕
  -  ⺼ + け/犬  =  脛
  -  お/頁 + け/犬  =  頚
  -  ん/止 + け/犬  =  罐
  -  む/車 + け/犬 + ほ/方  =  蚌
  -  け/犬 + 宿 + ね/示  =  剄
  -  け/犬 + 宿 + ぬ/力  =  勁
  -  け/犬 + 宿 + う/宀/#3  =  尨
  -  け/犬 + 宿 + す/発  =  彗
  -  け/犬 + 宿 + 心  =  慧
  -  き/木 + 宿 + け/犬  =  桀
  -  や/疒 + 宿 + け/犬  =  痙
  -  ⺼ + 囗 + け/犬  =  臙
  -  け/犬 + う/宀/#3 + り/分  =  豬
  -  け/犬 + す/発 + れ/口  =  貉
  -  ひ/辶 + 宿 + け/犬  =  逕
  -  か/金 + う/宀/#3 + け/犬  =  鐡
  -  お/頁 + 龸 + け/犬  =  頸

Notes

Braille patterns